A stone frigate is a naval establishment on land.

"Stone frigate" is an informal term that has its origin in Britain's Royal Navy after its use of Diamond Rock, an island off Martinique, as a 'sloop of war' to harass the French in 1803–04. The Royal Navy was prohibited from ruling over land, so the land was commissioned as a ship. The command of this first stone frigate was given to Commodore Hood's first lieutenant, James Wilkes Maurice, who, with cannon taken off the Commodore's ship, manned it with a crew of 120 until its capture by the French in the Battle of Diamond Rock in 1805.

Until the late 19th century, the Royal Navy housed training and other support facilities in hulks—old wooden ships of the line—moored in ports as receiving ships, depot ships, or floating barracks. The Admiralty regarded shore accommodation as expensive and liable to lead to indiscipline. These floating establishments kept their names while the actual vessels housing them changed. For example, the gunnery training school at Portsmouth occupied three ships between its foundation in 1830 and its move ashore in 1891 but all were named (or renamed) HMS Excellent.

As ships began to use increasingly complex technology during the late 19th century, these facilities became too large to continue afloat and were moved to shore establishments while keeping their names. An early "stone frigate" was the engineering training college HMS Marlborough, moved ashore to Portsmouth in 1880. The gunnery school continued to be named HMS Excellent after its move ashore to Whale Island in 1891. By World War I there were about 25 "stone frigates" in the United Kingdom.

Under section 87 of the Naval Discipline Act 1866, the provisions of the act only applied to officers and men of the Royal Navy borne on the books of a warship. When shore establishments began to become more common it was necessary to allocate the title of the establishment to an actual vessel which became the nominal depot ship for the men allocated to the establishment and thus ensured they were subject to the provisions of the Act. By example, in the Imperial fortress colony of Bermuda, the depot ship permanently berthed at the Royal Naval Dockyard from 1857 to 1897 was HMS Terror, which was replaced by the former troopship  (renamed HMS Terror in 1901). The former HMS Malabar was sold in 1918, following which the name HMS Malabar was applied to the Casemates Naval Barracks in the Royal Naval Dockyard as a stone frigate (under command of the Captain in Charge of the dockyard) to which all shore personnel at Bermuda, whether belonging to the dockyard, to outlying naval facilities (such as Admiralty House, Bermuda, Royal Naval Air Station Bermuda, or the Royal Naval wireless station (from 1961, NRS Bermuda) at Daniel's Head), or to minor vessels assigned to the dockyard for local use, were administratively assigned. As a consequence, HMS Malabar was often used interchangeably with HM Dockyard Bermuda or Royal Naval Dockyard Bermuda, and has been often mistaken as referring only to specific subordinate naval facilities in Bermuda, such as the wireless station at Daniel's Head or the Royal Naval Air Station. After the Bermuda dockyard was reduced to a base in the 1950s, the part that continued to operate as a naval base was commissioned as HMS Malabar until 1995.

The use of stone frigates continues in the Royal Navy and some other navies of the Commonwealth of Nations, including the Royal Canadian Navy, the Indian Navy, the Royal Australian Navy, and the Royal New Zealand Navy.

See also
Ascension Island, formerly called HMS Ascension
Coastal artillery
List of Royal Navy shore establishments
HMS Diamond Rock
HMCS Stone Frigate
USS Rancocas
USS Recruit (TDE-1)

References

Naval history
Military slang and jargon
Legal fictions